The Law of Elohim was a principle that Mormon men promised to obey during the endowment ceremony, which usually takes place in a temple. Mormon men promised to obey God's law, and in exchange God delivers to men the laws of obedience and sacrifice. The term is derived from Mormon teachings that "Elohim" is a name of God the Father. The law of Elohim was eliminated from the endowment by the Church of Jesus Christ of Latter-day Saints in 2013, however, the church did not speak about eliminating it until 2019. At which time church leaders encouraged members not to discuss or speculate on changes. 

Per the temple ceremony, The Law of Elohim was given to Adam and Eve after they ate the fruit of the tree of knowledge of good and evil. 
Prior to the ceremony changes in 2013 the Law of Elohim required Eve, and all female patrons, to speak these words:
“Adam, I now covenant to obey the Law of the Lord, and hearken to your counsel as you hearken unto Father.”

According to the temple ceremony, Eve was at fault for being the first to eat of the Fruit, and was thus put under covenant to follow her husband’s counsel rather than follow God directly.

The Church of Jesus Christ of Latter-day Saints changed the temple ceremony in 2013 when they began using updated videos. 
In the new videos, from 2013-2019, Eve was credited for making a wise choice in eating the Fruit, rather than receiving blame. 
As a result, the name of the Law was changed to “The Law of God”, and the words of the covenant were changed to:
“Elohim, I now covenant with Thee, that from this time forth I will obey Thy Law and keep Thy Commandments.”

Following the changes in 2013, Adam and Eve, and all temple patrons, speak this covenant. 
Eve, and the female patrons, no longer are required to take on Eve’s blame, and no longer are required to covenant to their husband to follow his counsel. 

The Church of Jesus Christ of Latter-day Saints did not take credit for giving Eve credit, however, until 2019, when the new videos, released only 6 years previously, were taken out of use. 
A slide show presentation was introduced in early 2019 in place of the videos. 

Additional changes made to the temple ceremony in 2019 are not widely known as church leaders have encouraged members not to discuss or speculate on these changes due to the sacred nature of these covenants. 

Some patrons, however, have expressed the following concerns:
These changes were made in 2013 without informing patrons about them.
The church released no information about these changes until 2019, at which time they put a gag order on members to discuss them. 
Patrons have questions about their own covenants, but answers are unavailable due to the admonition not to discuss them.

Some fundamentalist sects of Mormonism teach that "Elohim" is the name of a council of gods headed by God the Father, and that Mormon men are therefore promising to obey the law of a council of gods.

References

Latter Day Saint temple practices